David Wilson Colquhoun (9 January 1906 – 1983) was a Scottish professional footballer who played for Blantyre Victoria, St Mirren, Tottenham Hotspur, Luton Town and Rochdale.

Football career 
Colquhoun began his playing career at Blantyre Victoria before joining St Mirren. In 1931 the right half signed for Tottenham Hotspur where he featured in 87 matches and scored twice in all competitions between 1931–34. He joined Luton Town in 1934 and made a further 16 appearances before ending his career at Rochdale.

Personal life
He had five children Ann, Flora (known as Fay), Margaret, Willis (known as Bill), and George.

References

External links
Colquhoun information

1906 births
1983 deaths
Footballers from Motherwell
Scottish footballers
English Football League players
Scottish Football League players
Scottish Junior Football Association players
St Mirren F.C. players
Tottenham Hotspur F.C. players
Luton Town F.C. players
Rochdale A.F.C. players
Blantyre Victoria F.C. players
Association football wing halves